Saidabad-e Olya (also Romanized as Sa‘īdābād-e ‘Olya; also known as Seyyedābād-e Bālā) is a village in Esmaili Rural District, Esmaili District, Anbarabad County, Kerman Province, Iran. At the 2006 census, its population was 125, in 30 families.

References 

Populated places in Anbarabad County